Nick Bailen (born December 12, 1989) is an American-Belarusian professional ice hockey defensemen. He is currently playing for Kölner Haie of the Deutsche Eishockey Liga (DEL).

Playing career 
Undrafted, Bailen played collegiate for RPI Engineers men's ice hockey of ECAC Hockey, an NCAA Men's Division I Ice Hockey conference that compete in NCAA Division I ice hockey. After a short stint with the Rochester Americans of the American Hockey League in 2013, Bailen took his game overseas, spending the 2013–14 season with Tappara of the Finnish top-flight Liiga.

His next stop was Belarusian club, HC Dinamo Minsk of the KHL where he played from 2014 to December 2016. On December 21, 2016, he was released to contract with the Växjö Lakers of the Swedish Hockey League.

Bailen returned to the KHL for the following 2017–18 season, after an initial try-out he secured a two-year deal with Russian club, Traktor Chelyabinsk on September 5, 2017.

Following his fifth season with Traktor Chelyabinsk in 2021–22, on July 27, 2022, Bailen was mutually released from the remaining season of his contract with Traktor to hold his KHL rights' for three seasons. Bailen left the club as the franchise leader among defenseman and third overall in scoring with 48 goals and 156 points in 254 games.

On July 31, 2022, Bailen moved to Germany after signing a one-year contract with Kölner Haie of the DEL for the 2022–23 season.

International play
On December 1, 2014 he received Belarusian citizenship. In accordance with IIHF rules on nationality, Bailen was eligible to join the Belarusian national team. He received his first caps in 2016.

Career statistics

Regular season and playoffs

International

Awards and honors

References

External links

 Profile on the CHL website

1989 births
American men's ice hockey defensemen
Belarusian ice hockey defencemen
Bowling Green Falcons men's ice hockey players
HC Dinamo Minsk players
Ice hockey players from New York (state)
Indiana Ice players
Living people
RPI Engineers men's ice hockey players
People from Fredonia, New York
Rochester Americans players
Tappara players
Traktor Chelyabinsk players
Växjö Lakers players
Naturalized citizens of Belarus
AHCA Division I men's ice hockey All-Americans